Rear Admiral Lord John Hay,  (1 April 1793 – 9 September 1851) was a British naval officer and Whig politician.

Naval career
The third son of George Hay, 7th Marquess of Tweeddale, Hay entered the Navy in December 1804, appearing on the books of HMS Monarch. However, this was probably a nominal enrollment to increase his seniority. Hay's first real service was probably aboard HMS Seahorse, beginning in December 1806. He saw considerable action aboard Seahorse (42) on the Mediterranean station, under Captain John Stewart, losing his left arm on a cutting-out expedition in Hyères Bay in 1807. Hay was present during the Seahorse'''s epic fight, on 5 July 1808, with the Badere Zaffer (52) and Alis Fezan (24), which ended with the capture of the Badere Zaffer and the sinking of the Alis Fezan.

He was promoted lieutenant on 1 May 1812, and was appointed to HMS Pique, going to the West Indies station, on 1 June. He transferred to HMS Venerable on 31 May 1814 and was promoted commander on 15 June. On 15 November, Hay joined HMS Bustard, off Lisbon, and was given command of the sloop HMS Opossum in 1815. Opossum served in the Channel and on the North American station until paid off on 5 August 1818. He was made a post-captain on 7 December. On 23 July 1823, he was appointed a deputy lieutenant of East Lothian.

In 1826, he was returned as Member of Parliament for Haddingtonshire. However, due to his Whig connections, he was unable to obtain another command until 24 December 1832, when he was given the new frigate HMS Castor. In 1833, he received a medal from the Society for the Encouragement of the Arts for inventing a telescope-holder that could be used by a one-handed man. On 19 November 1836, he was transferred to the paddle sloop HMS Phoenix, and on 8 March 1837 to HMS North Star, which he commanded until 1840.

During much of this time, Hay acted as commodore of a squadron off the northern coast of Spain, with a naval brigade providing support for the Spanish government during the First Carlist War. For his actions during the war, particularly in helping to defend Bilbao, he was made a Companion of the Bath and received the Grand Cross of the Order of Charles III. After the war, Hay commanded HMS Warspite on the North American and West Indies station from 17 August 1841 to October 1845. It was Warspite'' which, in 1842, carried Lord Ashburton to America to negotiate the Webster-Ashburton Treaty. After briefly serving as superintendent of Woolwich Dockyard, Hay was returned as Member of Parliament for Windsor in 1847. He was also appointed Fourth Naval Lord in 1846 and Third Naval Lord in 1847.

Hay chaired the "Committee of Reference" that resulted in the retirement of Sir William Symonds as Surveyor of the Navy. However, Hay's own attempts at directing steam warship design, despite his interest in the subject, proved unsuccessful. The committee was disbanded, design placed in the hands of Symonds' successor, Sir Baldwin Walker, and Hay removed from the Board and made superintendent of Devonport Dockyard on 9 February 1850. Hay also resigned from Parliament by becoming Steward of the Manor of Northstead at this time. He was promoted rear admiral on 7 September 1851, hoisting his flag aboard HMS St George, but died two days later.

Family
In 1846, Hay married Mary Anne Cameron (died 30 November 1850), daughter of Donald Cameron, 23rd Lochiel: they had no children.

See also

References

External links

1793 births
1851 deaths
Companions of the Order of the Bath
Deputy Lieutenants of East Lothian
Lords of the Admiralty
Whig (British political party) MPs for English constituencies
Whig (British political party) MPs for Scottish constituencies
Members of the Parliament of the United Kingdom for Windsor
Royal Navy rear admirals
Military personnel of the First Carlist War
UK MPs 1826–1830
UK MPs 1847–1852
Younger sons of marquesses
Royal Navy personnel of the Napoleonic Wars